James Cooper (born February 12, 1982) is an American baseball coach and former outfielder. He played college baseball for the Grambling State Tigers from 2001 to 2004 before playing professionally from 2004 to 2006. He then served as head coach of the Grambling State Tigers (2010–2021).

Playing career
Cooper was an outfielder for Grambling, where he earned All-Conference honors and played under longtime head coach Wilbert Ellis.  He was drafted in the 33rd round of the 2004 MLB Draft by the Houston Astros.  He played two seasons in the Astros system, reaching Class A, and one season of independent baseball in the CanAm League for the Sussex Skyhawks before ending his playing career.

Coaching career

Grambling State
Cooper returned to Grambling as an assistant to new head coach Barret Rey.  He helped rebuild the Tigers program, qualifying for a pair of Southwestern Athletic Conference baseball tournament appearances in three years.  With Rey's departure for SWAC rival Alcorn State, Cooper was elevated to head coach. In his first season, Cooper led the Tigers to a SWAC Tournament championship and an appearance in the NCAA Regional. Cooper earned SWAC Coach of the Year honors for his efforts. During the 2019 season, Cooper obtained his 200th victory with a 19–2 win over University of Arkansas Pine Bluff on April 20, 2019. On November 9, 2021, Cooper resigned from his position with Grambling State to pursue a job with the New York Yankees.

New York Yankees
On November 10, 2021 Cooper accepted an outfield & baserunning position in the New York Yankees organization.

Head coaching record

References

External links

Living people
1982 births
Baseball outfielders
Grambling State Tigers baseball coaches
Grambling State Tigers baseball players
Baseball players from Shreveport, Louisiana
Sussex Skyhawks players
Tri-City ValleyCats players